TU8P is a Soviet, later Russian diesel locomotive, railcar or draisine for gauge .

History
The TU8P is used for passenger transport on narrow gauge railways. The TU8P was developed in 1987 - 1988 at the Kambarka Engineering Works to replace the ageing locomotive class TU6P. The cab is equipped with a heat-system, refrigerator, radio-set and air conditioning. The first diesel locomotive TU8P - № 0001 was delivered to the narrow gauge railway KSM-№2 with track gauge , TU8P diesel locomotive № 0007, 0008, 0056, 0057 were built with track  for the Sakhalin Railway. The TU8P (TY6P) motor railcar currently used on the Vietnamese railway network. The diesel locomotive TU8P & series AMD-1 are for railway track monitoring and inspection for the Russian railways with the track . The TU8P diesel locomotive № 0003 - 0004 were built for the Uzbekistan with the track gauge .

Additional specifications

Number of seats in the cabin - 14
Distance between bogies - 
Base of bogies -

Gallery

See also
Narrow gauge railways
Kambarka Engineering Works

References

External links

 TU8Р diesel locomotive 

Railcars
Railcars of Russia
750 mm gauge locomotives
Diesel locomotives of the Soviet Union
Diesel locomotives of Russia
Diesel locomotives of Ukraine
Diesel locomotives of Vietnam
3 ft 6 in gauge locomotives
5 ft gauge locomotives